High Altitude Venus Operational Concept (HAVOC) is a set of crewed NASA mission concepts to the planet Venus. All human portions of the missions would be conducted from lighter-than-air craft or from orbit.

Background
Conventional rocket engines will not work at those pressures. Hence, human missions to Venus have historically been thought impractical, if not impossible. However, Venus has advantages for crewed travel, such as being closer than Mars, an Earth-like gravity (0.904 g) and an atmosphere that provides a level of protection from solar and interstellar radiation.

Whereas all ground missions measured their operational time in minutes or hours, the Soviet Vega missions found success in launching small balloons, that operated until their batteries were exhausted (days). Therefore breathable air acts as a buoyant gas. At the same time, the gravity at the proposed altitude is 8.73 m/s2 versus 9.81 m/s2 on Earth's surface.

Venus has an induced magnetosphere from the interaction of its thick atmosphere with the solar wind, and its nearer proximity to the Sun brings it further within the Sun's magnetic field, which decreases the interstellar radiation levels. With the addition of the reduced deep space exposure time, the radiation levels anticipated by astronauts are much less than an equivalent Mars mission.

Mission concepts

Phase 1
It would be used to test many of the technologies that would be used in the crewed version, including the dirigible, energy systems, and aerocapture and descent sled.

Phase 2
Phase 2 is for astronauts to orbit Venus. The individual components would be assembled remotely, and the crew would join the larger assembly when all the preparations are complete. There would be a return module sent to low Venus orbit ahead of the astronauts, with which they would rendezvous in Venusian orbit, before returning to Earth.

Phase 3
Phase 3 involves astronauts descending into the atmosphere, for 30 Earth days. The aeroshell would be used for heat dissipation. A parachute would be deployed to further slow the craft, before finally inflating the airship. Once inflated, the crew would live in the airship for a period equivalent to thirty Earth days, before detaching and ascending in the Venus Ascent Vehicle.

The outward journey for this phase would take 110 [Earth] days, and the return 300. The total mission time would thus be 440 days.

Phase 4
Phase 4 of the concept is to send humans into the atmosphere of Venus for 1 [Earth] year, similar to Phase 3 but longer.

Phase 5
Phase 5 is introducing a permanent human presence, in the Venusian atmosphere, by way of a permanent space station-type spacecraft.

See also
 Aerospace architecture

References

External links

NASA concept page
NASA animation of HAVOC in action

Missions to Venus
Human missions to Venus
Proposed space probes
Extraterrestrial aircraft
Airships